KSMC (89.5 FM) is a radio station broadcasting from the campus of Saint Mary's College of California in Moraga.

KSMC broadcasts at 89.5 on the FM dial with an effective radiated power of 800 watts, and as of 2012 has been streaming online.

Since the station's inception in 1975, it has been entirely student-run.

Student DJs have the opportunity to play music at school events such as barbecues, club meetings, or community building events.

History

 1975 – Inception
 1978 – Shut down when it lost its home in a condemned dorm when it was remodeled.
 1979 – Reopened with new equipment in the Student Union Building with a grant from the TransAmerica corporation.  
 2012 – Began streaming online via a website called TuneIn.

External links

Radio stations established in 1975
SMC
Saint Mary's College of California
SMC
1975 establishments in California